Watts v. Indiana, 338 U.S. 49 (1949), was a United States Supreme Court case in which the court ruled that the use of a confession obtained through rigorous interrogation methods by Law Enforcement violates the Fourteenth Amendment.

In his concurrence/dissent, Justice Robert Jackson famously opined, "To bring in a lawyer means a real peril to solution of the crime because, under our adversary system, he deems that his sole duty is to protect his client—guilty or innocent—and that, in such a capacity, he owes no duty whatever to help society solve its crime problem. Under this conception of criminal procedure, any lawyer worth his salt will tell the suspect in no uncertain terms to make no statement to police under any circumstances."

In this case, a defendant was subjected to rigorous interrogation methods, including being forced to sleep on the floor, resulting in a confession to having committed murder. The Supreme Court ruled that the confession was involuntary and reversed his conviction.

Thurgood Marshall represented the defendant, Robert A. Watts, in Watts v. Indiana.

See also
Due Process Clause
Other related police interrogation cases:
Massiah v. United States
Escobedo v. Illinois
Miranda v. Arizona
Berghuis v. Thompkins

References

External links
 

United States Supreme Court cases
United States Supreme Court cases of the Stone Court
1949 in United States case law
United States criminal procedure case law